Canadian International School may refer to:

 Canadian International School (Bangalore)
 Canadian International School of Beijing
 Canadian International School of Guangzhou
 Canadian International School of Vietnam
 Canadian International School of Hong Kong
 Canadian International School (Pakistan)
 Canadian International School of Phnom Penh
 Canadian International School (Singapore)
 Canadian International School (Tokyo)